The 1991 Asian Men's Handball Championship was the sixth Asian Championship, which was taking place from 22 August to 1 September 1991 in Hiroshima, Japan.

Preliminary round

Group A

Group B

Group C

Group D

Placement 9th–12th

11th/12th

9th/10th

Main round

Group E

Group F

Placement 5th–8th

7th/8th

5th/6th

Final round

Semifinals

Bronze medal match

Gold medal match

Final standing

References
Results

Asian Handball Championships
A
Handball
International handball competitions hosted by Japan
August 1991 sports events in Asia
September 1991 sports events in Asia